WRAD (1460 kHz) is a commercial radio station licensed to Radford, Virginia, serving Pulaski and Montgomery Counties in Virginia.  It simulcasts a talk radio format with co-owned WRAD-FM at 101.7 MHz.  Programming is also heard on FM translator 103.5 W278AJ in Blacksburg, Virginia.  

WRAD-AM-FM are owned by Monticello Media LLC.  The studios and offices are on Lee Highway in Radford.  By day, WRAD is powered at 5,000 watts non-directional.  But at night, to protect other stations on 1460 AM from interference, WRAD reduces power to only 37 watts.

Programming
Much of the weekday schedule on WRAD-AM-FM is nationally syndicated.  Hosts include Brian Kilmeade, Charlie Kirk, Sean Hannity, Ben Shapiro, Dave Ramsey and Red Eye Radio.  Weekends feature shows on money, health, real estate, guns and technology.  Weekend hosts include Kim Komando, Tom Gresham, as well as repeats of weekday shows.  Most hours begin with an update from Fox News Radio.

History
In 1965, it added a sister station, WRAD-FM at 101.7 MHz.

WRAD-AM-FM had been owned and operated by Cumulus Media, Inc. On September 6, 2018, Cumulus Media announced it will sell its Blacksburg cluster to Monticello Media. The sale was approved December 1, 2018.

Translator

References

External links

News and talk radio stations in the United States
RAD
Radio stations established in 1950
1950 establishments in Virginia